Pyrausta gracilalis is a moth in the family Crambidae. It is found in Cuba and Puerto Rico.

References

Moths described in 1871
gracilalis
Moths of the Caribbean